Judy Johnson (1899–1989) was an American baseball player. 

Judy Johnson may also refer to:

 Judy Johnson (singer) (born 1924)
 Judy Johnson, mother who made allegations of Satanic abuse in the McMartin preschool trial